This is a list of media in Banff, Alberta.

Radio

CFPE-FM and CFPF-FM are Banff's only local radio stations. The rest of the stations are rebroadcasters from Calgary, one out of Canmore, and another out of Edmonton. All serve the population of Banff.

Although all other radio stations originating from Calgary do not rebroadcast their signals into Banff, they can be heard in Banff as well, depending on elevation. For example, CBR-FM, a CBC Music affiliate that broadcasts at 102.1 FM and CIBK-FM 98.5 FM. Some of Red Deer's originating FM signals can also be heard in Banff.

To see a complete list of media in Calgary go to: Media in Calgary.

Television
All terrestrial television stations in the Banff area are repeaters of stations and networks that originate from Calgary.

The region is not designated as, nor part of, a mandatory market for digital television conversion. Only CICT-TV announced its intention to convert its transmitters to digital.

Print
Banff Crag & Canyon - Banff's community newspaper.
Rocky Mountain Outlook - Bow Valley's weekly community newspaper.
 

Banff
Banff, Alberta
Media, Banff
Culture of Banff, Alberta